The Mediterranean Island of Malta has been featured in the following films:

 1942 - Malta G.C. (documentary, narrated by Laurence Olivier)
 1953 - Malta Story
 1970 - Hell Boats 
 1973 - The Mackintosh Man 
 1976 - Charas (1976 film)
 1983 - Trenchcoat 
 1985 - Final Justice 
 2005 - Angli: The Movie
 2007 - Bawxatti - Il-Ħarba 
 2007 - Qerq 
 2007 - Youth Without Youth 
 2008 - Anno Domani XXXIII
 2008 - Operation White Dove
 2013 - World War Z
 2017 - Love to Paradise
 2018 - Divine Beauty (Award-winning - Independent Shorts Awards)
 2019 - Made in Malta

See also 
List of films shot in Malta
List of Maltese films

External links 
Malta Film Locations for TV Shows and Movies - krolltravel.com

Malta
 
Maltese culture
Films